Nematabad-e Ghar (also Romanized as Ne‘matābād-e Ghār and Ne‘matābād-e Chār; also known as Sa‘īdābād) is a village in Aftab Rural District, Aftab District, Tehran County, Tehran Province, Iran. At the 2006 census, its population was 62, in 15 families.

References 

Populated places in Tehran County